= Statue of William D. McKinnon =

Statue in San Francisco, California, U.S.

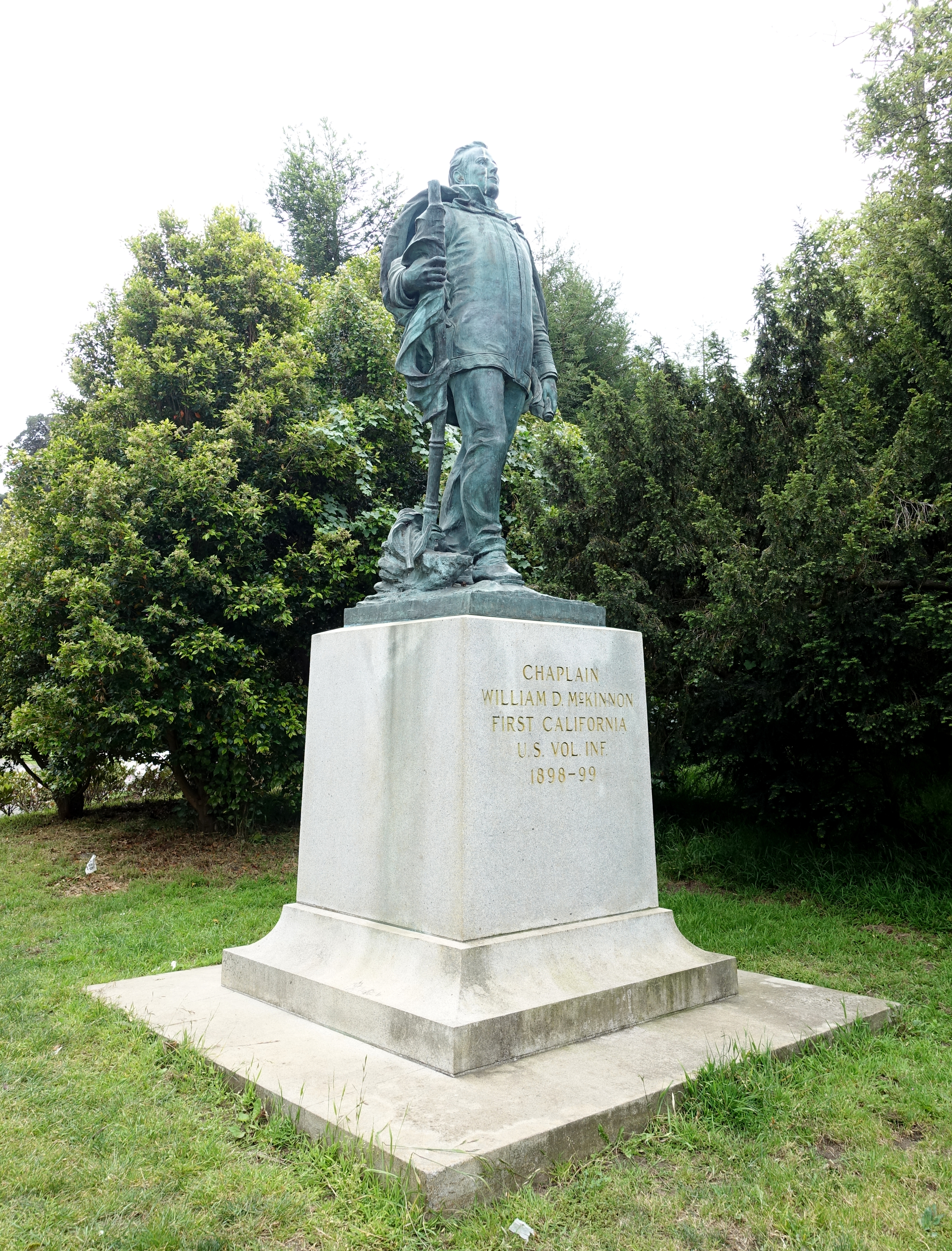
- The statue in 2015
- Subject: William D. McKinnon
- Location: Golden Gate Park; San Francisco; 37°46′20.1″N 122°27′54.5″W

A statue of William D. McKinnon is installed in San Francisco's Golden Gate Park, in the U.S. state of California.
